Dimapur Railway Station is a railway station on the Lumding–Dibrugarh section. It is located in Dimapur District in the Indian state of Nagaland. It serves Dimapur and its surrounding areas.

History 
The -wide metre-gauge railway earlier laid by Assam Bengal Railway from Chittagong to Lumding was extended to Tinsukia on the Dibru–Sadiya line in 1903.

The project for the conversion of the Lumding–Dibrugarh section from metre gauge to  broad gauge was completed by the end of 1997.

Major Trains
 15603/15604 Guwahati–Ledo Intercity Express
 12423/12424 Dibrugarh Rajdhani Express
 15909/15910 Avadh Assam Express

Under-construction line to Kohima 

As of July 2020, the Dhansiri–Zubza line to Kohima is expected to be completed by March 2023.

The -long Dimapur–Zubza–Kohima new line project has the status of a National Project. Final location survey has been completed for the entire project.

As of August 2019, the 25% work on the 82.5 km line from Dhansiri to Zubza near state capital Kohima has been completed, railway has requested the Nagaland govt to expedite the land  acquisition process which is holding up progress on this rail link.

Future extension 
Chinese govt has proposed to Myanmar to connect the existing Myitkyina railhead in North Myanmar on China–Myanmar border to west to Zubza/Dimapur railhead in Nagaland of India, and to east to Dehong Dai and Jingpo Autonomous Prefecture in Yunnan of China.

Amenities 
Dimapur railway station has two four-bedded retiring rooms and a four-bedded dormitory.

References

External links 
 

Dimapur railway station Walk through video

Railway stations in Dimapur district
Lumding railway division
Transport in Dimapur